Mister Twister may refer to:

 Mister Twister (band), a Russian rockabilly band
 Mister Twister (comics), the name of three characters in DC Comics
 Mister Twister, a roller coaster at Elitch Gardens
 "Mister Twister" (poem), a satirical anti-racist poem by Samuel Marshak
 "Mister Twister" (song), Connie Francis song
 Mister Twister, a brand of soft plastic fishing lures